Roseovarius atlanticus is a Gram-negative bacterium from the genus of Roseovarius which has been isolated from seawater from the Atlantic Ocean.

References

External links
Type strain of Roseovarius atlanticus at BacDive -  the Bacterial Diversity Metadatabase

Rhodobacteraceae
Bacteria described in 2016